Paired immunoglobin like type 2 receptor alpha is a protein that in humans is encoded by the PILRA gene.

Function 
Cell signaling pathways rely on a dynamic interaction between activating and inhibiting processes. SHP-1-mediated dephosphorylation of protein tyrosine residues is central to the regulation of several cell signaling pathways. Two types of inhibitory receptor superfamily members are immunoreceptor tyrosine-based inhibitory motif (ITIM)-bearing receptors and their non-ITIM-bearing, activating counterparts.

Control of cell signaling via SHP-1 is thought to occur through a balance between PILRalpha-mediated inhibition and PILRbeta-mediated activation. These paired immunoglobulin-like receptor genes are located in a tandem head-to-tail orientation on chromosome 7. This particular gene encodes the ITIM-bearing member of the receptor pair, which functions in the inhibitory role. Alternative splicing has been observed at this locus, and three variants, each encoding a distinct isoform, are described.

In contrast to PILRbeta, which has only one known natural ligand, PILRalpha has many known protein-protein interactions. PILRalpha recruits PTPN6 and PTPN1 via interactions of its ITIM motifs. PILRalpha is also used by some viruses, notably HSV-1, for cell entry.

Structure 
As with other paired receptors, PILRalpha has a longer cytoplasmic tail compared to PILRbeta and features two intracellular ITIM motifs. PILRalpha has an extracellular domain with a siglec-like immunoglobulin fold that substitutes hydrophobic interactions for the siglec fold's characteristic disulfide bond. The structure of this domain is very similar to that of PILRbeta, but the two proteins nevertheless have different binding affinities for sialic acid.

References

Further reading